Melos is a progressive rock album released in 1973 by the Italian band Cervello.

The lyrics focus around an interpretation of the singing from a Greek mythology point of view. The music is a successful fusion of Mediterranean sounds with typical complex progressive rock ones, as well as with experimental parts. Flutes are dominant in much of the songs, as four members of the band played that instrument.

Track listing
All music composed by Gian Pietro Marazza; all lyrics by Ermanno Parazzini
"Canto del capro" – 6:30
"Trittico" – 7:14
"Euterpe" – 4:27
"Scinsione (T.R.M)" – 5:39
"Melos" – 2:52
"Galassia" – 5:45
"Affresco" – 1:11

Personnel
Cervello
Corrado Rustici - guitar, vibes, flute, voice
Giulio D'Ambrosio - flute, saxophone
Gianluigi Di Franco - voice, flute, percussions
Remigio Esposito - drums
Antonio Spagnolo - bass, acoustic guitar, recorder

References

External links
 www.corradorustici.com Corrado Rustici's official website
 www.progreviews.com
 Youtube clip

1973 albums